The People's Front (abbreviation: PF) was a short-lived party that was registered on 21 May 1971 where some members from a faction of Barisan Sosialis (BS) that was mostly Chinese-speaking had decided to resign from BS. However, their existence was only prominent in 1972 election because by November 1976, most of its members had instead chose to join Workers' Party where the 1976 general election was held in December 1976. Eventually after 1976 general election, the few remaining party members who participated in 1976 election had decided to join United Front instead, and the party hence left dormant.

References
Background of People's Front (Singapore)

Defunct political parties in Singapore
Political parties established in 1971
1971 establishments in Singapore